Daisuke Sato may refer to:

Daisuke Satō (1964–2017), Japanese board game designer, novelist, and manga writer
Daisuke Sato (footballer) (born 1994), Filipino footballer